Straža is a settlement in the Municipality of Šentrupert in southeastern Slovenia. It lies on the road from Šentrupert towards Mirna in the historical region of Lower Carniola. The municipality is now included in the Southeast Slovenia Statistical Region. The settlement includes the hamlets of Kurja Dolina, Grilov Hrib, and Praproče.

References

External links
Straža at Geopedia

Populated places in the Municipality of Šentrupert